Towradgi is a small beach-side suburb approximately  north of Wollongong, New South Wales, Australia. Towradgi is derived from the Dharawal word Kow-radgi, meaning "guardian of the sacred stones". On an early map it was called Towroger. Towradgi is served by electric trains at Towradgi railway station, opened in 1948.

Towradgi is bordered to the north by Corrimal, the west by Fernhill and Tarrawanna, and to the south by Fairy Meadow. The Pacific Ocean can be found to the east. Towradgi has also come to incorporate much of the former suburb of Reidtown (to the south-west), some of which has also been incorporated into Fairy Meadow.

Towradgi has a surf club along with a bowling and recreation club, Chinese restaurant, croquet club, 2 petrol stations, hairdresser, retirement village, Towradgi Public School, train station, many open parks and a rock pool.

One of Towradgi's landmarks is the small bridge on Towradgi Road that passes over the south coast train line at Towradgi station.  This bridge is affectionately known in the area as "the hump" due to its short and steep rise, and it is not uncommon for some cars to become airborne if they pass over this bridge at a high speed.

East of Towradgi is Towradgi Point, the location of the Towradgi rockpool, a mildly jutting rocky projection to the east. The rockpool itself is at the tip of the point. To the north is the entrance to Towradgi Creek and to the south and north are small areas of rocks, known as "Black Rocks".

Towradgi Creek goes inland from Corrimal Beach. A short distance out to sea from here is the point where the famous ship, Queen of Nations, was wrecked in the 1880s. It lies just north of the pools and, at low tide, a darkish blur marks it. A plaque at the point tells the story of the wreck. The captain, Samuel Bache, who, in his drunken state, thought the Mount Keira coal mine slag heap fires to be the light on Port Jackson's South Head in Sydney, crashed the barque clipper vessel on 31 May 1881. The first mate was equally drunk and threatened crew members. It is now a protected wreck site. The ship was transporting alcohol at the time, which explains this accident.

Many go to the point to see the fine views of Wollongong and north to Corrimal, Bellambi Point and the northern escarpment and Sublime Point, as well as views from the park to Knight's Hill and the southern mountains. The bridge across the creek was remade in 2006 and is used by cyclists and walkers; here the Wollongong to Thirroul Bike Track is split into two designated paths.

The point is also home to a park and recreation area with a bike path, part of the Wollongong to Thirroul Bike Track, and a picnic area. It is a popular spot for surfing and swimming.

South of the point on the beach is the site where George Bass and Matthew Flinders, with their helper Martin, attempted to land. A plaque commemorates when the sea took out their vessel, the Tom Thumb, and filled it with water on 21 March 1796. They managed to bale it out and continue, having collected water from Towradgi Creek.

Erosion from June 2007 storms has damaged the beach and some beach entrance tracks, but most areas with vegetation have borne it well.

History
Towradgi is a corruption of a Dharawal word meaning the guardian of the sacred stones. On early maps, it was originally known as Towroger, according to Henderson's Early Illawarra.

On 26 March 1796, just south of Towradgi Point, George Bass and Matthew Flinders, along with their young helper Martin made an attempted landing on the coast. At the same time, European settlers became the first to set foot on the soil of Illawarra.

In 1887, the South Coast railway line reached Towradgi. On 18 December 1948, Towradgi railway station was opened.

References

External links

Towradgi Surf Life Saving Club, NSW Australia
Towradgi Beach Hotel
Towradgi Community Web Portal
Towradgi Public School

Suburbs of Wollongong